The Scarsdale Handicap was an American Thoroughbred horse race open to horses age three and older first run on October 16, 1918, over a mile and seventy yards on dirt at Empire City Race Track in Yonkers, New York.

Historical notes
In its second year, the Scarsdale Handicap was run as the Westchester Handicap before reverting to its original name in 1920.

In 1942, Empire City Racetrack terminated flat racing and the facility reverted to hosting only harness racing events. After that, the Scarsdale Handicap was run at Jamaica Race Course in Jamaica, Queens, New York.

Race moments
The 1918 inaugural running was won by War Cloud, a three-year-old colt who had finished fourth in that year's Kentucky Derby, won the Preakness Stakes and ran second in the Belmont Stakes. Two months earlier future U.S. Racing Hall of Fame inductee Roamer had broken Salvator's record for the mile that had stood for twenty-eight years. As such, bettors sent War Cloud off as the 7-5 second choice behind 4-5 favorite Roamer.

The recently acquired Seabiscuit got his first stakes race win for new owner Charles Howard's on September 7, 1936, in the Governor's Handicap at the Detroit Fairgrounds Racetrack and then won the Hendrie Handicap at the same track on September 26. The colt continued to show his real talent under the care of trainer Tom Smith and jockey Red Pollard with his win in the Scarsdale Handicap on October 24, 1936.

Purchased for $100 by owner/trainer Tommy Heard, in 1942 Boysy became the first horse to win the Scarsdale twice. He came back the next year to capture the race for the third straight time, going wire-to-wire in winning by three lengths.

In the 1946 Scarsdale, Albert Snider, one of the most promising young riders of the time, rode Polynesian to victory. Snider would go on to become a first-string jockey with Calumet Farm and in 1948 was the regular jockey for the great Citation. He was scheduled to ride Citation in the U.S. Triple Crown series but disappeared on March 5, 1948, while fishing off the coast of Florida with two friends. Despite a lengthy and intensive search, their bodies were never recovered. Snider's death opened the door for Eddie Arcaro to ride Citation to win the Triple Crown.

The Scarsdale Handicap's twenty-eighth and final running in 1947 was won by With Pleasure who defeated a stellar field that included two future U.S. Racing Hall of Fame inductees and the previous year's American Champion Two-Year-Old Male Horse. It was Gallorette who finished second, with Double Jay in third, Donor fourth, and Stymie, the then richest racehorse in United States history who finished sixth.

Race distances
1 mile, 70 yards : 1918, 1925-1947
1 mile : 1919-1924

Records
Speed record: 
1 mile : 1:38 1/5 - Tryster (1922) (New track record)
1 mile, 70 yards : 1:41 3/5 - Seven Hearts  (1944) at Jamaica
1 mile, 70 yards : 1:42 0/0 - Psychic Bid (1935) at Empire City

Most wins:
 3 - Boysy (1941, 1942, 1943)

Most wins by a jockey:
 3 - Jack Westrope (1938, 1931, 1947)

Most wins by a trainer:
 3 - Tommy Heard (1941, 1942, 1943)

Most wins by an owner:
 3 - Tommy Heard (1941, 1942, 1943)

Winners

References

Empire City Race Track
Jamaica Race Course
Discontinued horse races in New York (state)
Open mile category horse races
Sports competitions in New York City
Recurring sporting events established in 1918
Recurring sporting events disestablished in 1947
1918 establishments in New York (state)
1947 disestablishments in New York (state)